A millipede is a myriapod with two pairs of legs on most segments.

Millipede may also refer to:

Millipede (video game), a 1982 arcade game sequel to Centipede
Millipede memory, non-volatile computer memory

See also
Centipede (disambiguation)

de:Millipede